Pararge xiphia, the Madeiran speckled wood, is a butterfly of the family Nymphalidae. It is found on the island of Madeira.  It is considered as endangered due to competition from a related butterfly Pararge aegeria.

Adults are on the wing year round.

The larvae feed on various plants, including Brachypodium sylvaticum, Holcus lanatus and Agrostis gigantea.

External links
Satyrinae of the Western Palearctic
 Mario Maier: Europäische Schmetterlinge
www.schmetterling-raupe.de
Moths and Butterflies of Europe and North Africa
Captain's European Butterfly Guide
"Pararge Hübner, [1819]" at Markku Savela's Lepidoptera and Some Other Life Forms
Fauna Europaea

Elymniini
Butterflies described in 1775
Taxa named by Johan Christian Fabricius